Nansen passports, originally and officially stateless persons passports, were internationally recognized refugee travel documents from 1922 to 1938, first issued by the League of Nations's Office of the High Commissioner for Refugees to stateless refugees. They quickly became known as "Nansen passports" for their promoter, the Norwegian statesman and polar explorer Fridtjof Nansen.

History

The end of World War I saw significant turmoil, leading to a refugee crisis. Numerous governments were toppled, and national borders were redrawn, often along generally ethnic lines. Civil war broke out in some countries. Many people left their homes because of war or persecution or fear thereof. The upheaval resulted in many people being without passports, or even nations to issue them, which prevented much international travel, often trapping refugees. The precipitating event for the Nansen passport was the 1921 announcement by the new government of the Soviet Union revoking the citizenship of Russians living abroad, including some 800,000 refugees from the Russian civil war.  The first Nansen passports were issued following an international agreement reached at the Intergovernmental Conference on Identity Certificates for Russian Refugees, convened by Fridtjof Nansen in Geneva from July 3, 1922, to July 5, 1922, in his role as High Commissioner for Refugees for the League of Nations. By 1942, they were honoured by governments in 52 countries.

In 1924, the Nansen arrangement was broadened to also include Armenian, and in 1928 to Assyrian, Assyro-Chaldean, Bulgarian and Turkish refugees.  Approximately 450,000 Nansen passports were provided to stateless people and refugees who needed travel documents, but could not obtain one from a national authority.

Following Nansen's death in 1930, the passport was handled by the Nansen International Office for Refugees within the League of Nations. At that point the passport no longer included a reference to the 1922 conference, but were issued in the name of the League. The office was closed in 1938; passports were thereafter issued by a new agency, the Office of the High Commissioner for Refugees under the Protection of the League of Nations in London.

Image gallery

Legacy
The Nansen International Office for Refugees was awarded the 1938 Nobel Peace Prize for its efforts to establish the Nansen passports.

While Nansen passports are no longer issued, existing national and supranational authorities, including the United Nations, issue travel documents for stateless people and refugees, including certificates of identity (or "alien's passports") and refugee travel documents.

Notable bearers
Robert Capa
Sergiu Celibidache
Princess Vera Constantinovna of Russia
Marc Chagall
Françoise Frenkel
Alexander Galich
Zuzanna Ginczanka
Alexander Grothendieck
G. I. Gurdjieff
Anatol Heintz
Ze'ev Jabotinsky
Youri Messen-Jaschin – artist Op art, Switzerland
Vladimir Nabokov – fictionally, Timofey Pnin, the protagonist in Pnin, migrated to the United States on a Nansen passport, as did Valeria, the first wife of Humbert Humbert in Lolita
Aristotle Onassis
Krikor Pambuccian
Colonel Tom Parker
Anna Pavlova
Grand Duchess Maria Pavlovna of Russia (1890–1958)
 St. Grigol Peradze
Jadwiga Piłsudska
Sergey Rakhmaninov
Dimitri Riabouchinsky
Rabbi Menachem Mendel Schneerson
Otto Skorzeny
Victor Starffin
Igor Stravinsky
Dries Riphagen
 King Alfonso XIII of Spain

See also
World Passport

References

External links
Fridtjof Nansen Memorial Lecture Series United Nations University
The Nansen Passport New York University Department of Media, Culture, and Communication's Media Archaeology's Dead Media Archive

Defunct passports
Passport
League of Nations
Identity documents
Refugees
Statelessness
1922 introductions